Prairieton Township is one of seventeen townships in Christian County, Illinois, USA.  As of the 2020 census, its population was 425 and it contained 177 housing units.

Geography

Cities, towns, villages
 Moweaqua (west side)

Unincorporated towns
 Radford at

Cemeteries
The township contains these four cemeteries: Adams, Bilyeu, Hayes and Jacobs.

Major highways
  U.S. Route 51

Demographics
As of the 2020 census there were 425 people, 182 households, and 160 families residing in the township. The racial makeup of the township was 95.53% White, 1.41% African American, 0.00% Native American, 0.00% Asian, 0.00% Pacific Islander, 0.00% from other races, and 3.06% from two or more races. Hispanic or Latino of any race were 0.94% of the population.

There were 182 households, out of which 58.80% had children under the age of 18 living with them, 87.91% were married couples living together, 0.00% had a female householder with no spouse present, and 12.09% were non-families. 12.10% of all households were made up of individuals, and 10.40% had someone living alone who was 65 years of age or older. The average household size was 2.93 and the average family size was 3.19.

The township's age distribution consisted of 34.1% under the age of 18, 2.8% from 18 to 24, 35% from 25 to 44, 20.2% from 45 to 64, and 7.7% who were 65 years of age or older. The median age was 34.1 years. For every 100 females, there were 87.0 males. For every 100 females age 18 and over, there were 123.6 males.

The median income for a household in the township was $99,688, and the median income for a family was $102,083. Males had a median income of $53,472 versus $34,063 for females. The per capita income for the township was $33,404. About 5.6% of families and 3.8% of the population were below the poverty line.

School districts
 Central A & M Community Unit School District 21
 Meridian Community Unit School District 15
 Taylorville Community Unit School District 3

Political districts
 State House District 87
 State Senate District 44

References
 
 United States Census Bureau 2009 TIGER/Line Shapefiles
 United States National Atlas

External links
 City-Data.com
 Illinois State Archives
 Township Officials of Illinois

Adjacent Townships

Townships in Christian County, Illinois
Townships in Illinois